Jaybird is an unincorporated community in Adams County, in the U.S. state of Ohio.

History
A post office called Jaybird was established in 1881, and remained in operation until 1931. Jaybird once had its own school.

References

Unincorporated communities in Adams County, Ohio
1881 establishments in Ohio
Populated places established in 1881
Unincorporated communities in Ohio